The Diocese of The Hague and the Netherlands is a diocese of the Russian Orthodox Church (ROC) which covers the territory of Netherlands. This diocese is part of the Patriarchal Exarchate in Western Europe since 28 December 2018.

History

1972-2017 
At the same time, two parishes of the Moscow Patriarchate operated in the Netherlands under the direction of Bishop Dionysius (Lukin) of Rotterdam, vicar of the ROC .

On August 18, 1972 Bishop Jacob was received into the Moscow Patriarchate with his clergy and flock; the Diocese of The Hague was established within the Western European Exarchate of the Russian Orthodox Church. Bishop Dionysius was dismissed and appointed rector of the stauropegic parish of the icon of the mother of God "the quick-listener" in Rotterdam.

Services in churches and monasteries of the Diocese of The Hague were celebrated in Church Slavonic and Dutch. Bishop Dionysius, Archimandrite Adrian (Korporaal), and Archpriest Alexis Voogd worked on translations of Orthodox liturgical texts into Dutch.

On June 20, 2004, the first Russian Orthodox church in the history of the Netherlands was consecrated in the name of Prince Alexander Nevsky in Rotterdam.

On 28 December 2017, the Holy Synod of the Russian Orthodox Church expressed its gratitude to Archbishop Elisey for his labours in building up church life in the Diocese of Sourozh and gave him a new position of service as primate of the Diocese of The Hague and the Netherlands of the Russian Orthodox Church.

Within the PEWE 
On December 28, 2018, the Diocese of The Hague and Netherlands became part of then-established Patriarchal Exarchate in Western Europe (PEWE).

Ruling bishops 

 Jacob (Akkersdijk) (18 August 1972 - 30 December 1988)
 Vladimir (Sabodan) (30 December 1988 - 20 February 1990) locum tenens
 Kirill (Gundyaev) (20 February 1990 - 30 August 1991) locum tenens
 Simon (Ishunin) (30 August 1991 - 28 December 2017) locum tenens
 Elisey (Ganaba) (since 28 December 2017)

References 

Eastern Orthodoxy in the Netherlands
Eparchies of the Russian Orthodox Church
Christian organizations established in 1972